Lee Kyu-yeon's Spotlight (Korean: 이규연의 스포트라이트; RR: Lee Kyu-yeonui seupoteuraiteu) is a South Korean investigative journalism program hosted by Lee Kyu-yeon. It airs at Saturdays at 19:40 KST on JTBC.

History 
Host Lee Kyu-yeon said in a Social Live that he has been inspired by Spotlight, the Boston Globe investigative team which uncovered the Catholic Church sexual abuse cases, which in turn inspired the 2015 Academy Award-winning film Spotlight. Lee also heads JTBC News' Exploration and Planning Bureau, which produces the program. He describes Spotlight as a program that covers various fields such as social issues, welfare, science and technology. It was going to be called just Spotlight at first, but Sohn Suk-hee, JTBC News' president at the time, suggested that he change it to Lee Kyu-yeon's Spotlight.

Broadcast times

Awards and nominations

Notes 

 Its slogan is "Shed light on the world", as seen on its opening title.
 Previous episodes can be viewed through its official website, YouTube channel or the JTBC Culture YouTube channel

References 

Investigative journalism
JTBC original programming